The 2018 Atlantic Coast Conference (ACC) Softball tournament will be held at Shirley Clements Mewborn Field on the campus of Georgia Tech in Atlanta, Georgia from May 9 through May 12, 2018. 

This is the first year of a 10-team tournament. The 1st Round, quarterfinals and semifinals will be shown on the ACC RSN's with a simulcast on ACC Extra. The championship game will be broadcast by ESPN.

Tournament

All times listed are Eastern Daylight Time.

Broadcasters
Tom Werme & Cheri Kempf (Wed, Early Thurs, Fri)
Tom Werme & Barbara Jordan (Thurs Evening)
Pam Ward & Cheri Kempf (Sat)

References

Tournament
Atlantic Coast Conference softball tournament